The 693d Radar Squadron is an inactive United States Air Force unit. It was last assigned to the 20th Air Division, Aerospace Defense Command, stationed at Dauphin Island Air Force Station, Alabama. It was inactivated on 30 September 1970.

The unit was a General Surveillance Radar squadron providing for the air defense of the United States.

Lineage
 Established as 693d Aircraft Control and Warning Squadron
 Activated on 1 April 1958
 Redesignated as 693d Radar Squadron (SAGE) on 1 March 1961
 Inactivated on 30 September 1970

Assignments
 35th Air Division, 1 April 1958
 32d Air Division, 15 November 1958
 Montgomery Air Defense Sector, 1 November 1959
 32d Air Division, 1 April 1966
 33d Air Division, 14 November 1969
 20th Air Division, 19 November 1969 – 30 September 1970

Stations
 Dobbins AFB, Georgia, 8 April 1958
 Dauphin Island AFS, Alabama, 1 September 1958 – 30 September 1970

References

  Cornett, Lloyd H. and Johnson, Mildred W., A Handbook of Aerospace Defense Organization  1946 - 1980,  Office of History, Aerospace Defense Center, Peterson AFB, CO (1980).
 Winkler, David F. & Webster, Julie L., Searching the Skies, The Legacy of the United States Cold War Defense Radar Program,  US Army Construction Engineering Research Laboratories, Champaign, IL (1997).

External links

Radar squadrons of the United States Air Force
Aerospace Defense Command units